TKIP may refer to:

 Temporal Key Integrity Protocol, an algorithm used to secure wireless computer networks
 Communist Workers Party of Turkey, TKİP, the (Türkiye Komünist İşçi Partisi)